Women's Slalom World Cup 1969/1970

Final point standings

In Women's Slalom World Cup 1969/70 the best 3 results count.

Women's Slalom
FIS Alpine Ski World Cup slalom women's discipline titles